David Koresh (born Vernon Wayne Howell; August 17, 1959 – April 19, 1993) was an American cult leader who played a central role in the Waco siege of 1993. As the head of the Branch Davidians, a religious sect and offshoot of the Davidian Seventh-day Adventists, Koresh claimed to be its final prophet. His apocalyptic Biblical teachings, including interpretations of the Book of Revelation and the Seven Seals, attracted various followers.

Coming from a dysfunctional background, Koresh was a member and later a leader of the Branch Davidians, a movement originally led by Benjamin Roden, based at the Mount Carmel Center outside Waco, Texas. Here, Koresh competed for dominance with another leader, Benjamin Roden's son George, until Koresh and his followers took over Mount Carmel in 1987. In the early 1990s, he became subject to allegations about polygamy and child sexual abuse by former Branch Davidian associates, although investigation by authorities found no conclusive evidence.

Further allegations related to the Branch Davidians' stockpiling of weapons led the Bureau of Alcohol, Tobacco, and Firearms (ATF) and later the FBI to launch a raid on the group's Mount Carmel compound in February 1993. During the 51-day siege and violence that ensued, Koresh was wounded by ATF forces and later died of a gunshot in unclear circumstances as the compound was destroyed in a fire.

Early life
David Koresh was born Vernon Wayne Howell on August 17, 1959, in Houston, Texas, to a 14-year-old single mother, Bonnie Sue Clark, and father Bobby Wayne Howell. Before Koresh was born, his father met another teenaged girl and abandoned Bonnie Sue, who began cohabitating with a violent alcoholic. In 1963, Koresh's mother left with her boyfriend and placed her four-year-old son in the care of his maternal grandmother, Earline Clark. His mother returned when he was seven, after her marriage to a carpenter named Roy Haldeman. Bonnie Sue and Haldeman had a son together, named Roger, who was born in 1966.

Koresh did not meet his father until he was 17.

Koresh described his early childhood as lonely. Due to his poor study skills and dyslexia partially caused by poor eyesight, he was put in special education classes and nicknamed "Vernie" by his fellow students. Koresh dropped out of Garland High School in his junior year.

When he was 19 years old, Koresh had an illegal sexual relationship with a 15-year-old girl who became pregnant. He claimed to have become a born-again Christian in the Southern Baptist Church and soon joined his mother's denomination, the Seventh-day Adventist Church. There, Koresh became infatuated with the pastor's daughter; and while praying for guidance, he opened his eyes and allegedly found the Bible open at Isaiah 34:16, stating that "none should want for her mate". Convinced this was a sign from God, Koresh approached the pastor and told him that God wanted him to have his daughter for a wife. The pastor threw him out, and when he continued to persist with his pursuit of the daughter, he was expelled from the congregation.

In 1981, Koresh moved to Waco, Texas, where he joined the Branch Davidians (not to be confused with the original Davidian Seventh-Day Adventist Church). Benjamin Roden, who died in 1978, had originated the Branch group in 1955 with new teachings that were not connected with the original Davidians. Koresh played guitar and sang in church services at the Mount Carmel Center, the sect's headquarters outside Waco.

Ascent to leadership of the Branch Davidians
In 1983, Koresh began claiming the gift of prophecy. David Thibodeau, in his 1999 book, A Place Called Waco, speculated that he had a sexual relationship with Lois Roden, the widow of Benjamin Roden and leader of the sect, who was then in her late 60s. Koresh eventually began to claim that God had chosen him to father a child by Lois, who would be the Chosen One. In 1983, Lois allowed Koresh to begin teaching his own message, called "The Serpent's Root", which caused controversy in the group. Lois's son George Roden intended to be the group's next leader and considered Koresh an interloper.

When Koresh announced that God had instructed him to marry Rachel Jones (who then added Koresh to her name), a period of calm ensued at the Mount Carmel Center, but it proved only temporary. A fire destroyed a $500,000 administration building and press; Roden said Koresh started the fire, but Koresh replied that "no man set that fire" and that it was a judgment of God. Roden, claiming to have the support of the majority of the sect, forced Koresh and his group off the property at gunpoint. Koresh and around 25 followers set up camp at Palestine, Texas,  from Waco, where they lived under rough conditions in buses and tents for the next two years. During this time, Koresh undertook recruitment of new followers in California, the United Kingdom, Israel, and Australia. That same year, he traveled to Israel, where he claimed he had a vision that he was the modern-day Cyrus.

The founder of the Davidian movement, Victor Houteff, wanted to be God's implement and establish the Davidic kingdom in Palestine. Koresh also wanted to be God's tool and set up the Davidic kingdom in Jerusalem. At least until 1990, he believed the place of his martyrdom might be in Israel; however, by 1991, he was convinced that his martyrdom would be in the U.S. instead of in Israel. He said the prophecies of Daniel would be fulfilled in Waco and that the Mount Carmel Center was the Davidic kingdom.

After being exiled to the Palestine camp, Koresh and his followers eked out a primitive existence. When Lois died in 1986, the exiled Branch Davidians wondered if they would ever be able to return to the Mount Carmel Center, but despite the displacement "Koresh now enjoyed the loyalty of the majority of the [Branch Davidian] community". In 1987, Roden exhumed at least one body from the community cemetery. Roden said he was just moving the cemetery, while Koresh claimed that Roden had issued a challenge to resurrect the body (and that whoever resurrected the body would be the new leader). Koresh went to authorities to file charges against Roden for illegally exhuming a corpse, but was told he would have to show proof (such as a photograph of the corpse).

Koresh seized the opportunity to seek criminal prosecution of Roden by returning to the Mount Carmel Center with seven armed followers, allegedly attempting to get photographic proof of the exhumation. Koresh's group was discovered by Roden, and a gunfight broke out. When the sheriff arrived, Roden had already suffered a minor gunshot wound and was pinned down behind a tree. As a result of the incident, Koresh and his followers were charged with attempted murder. At the trial, Koresh explained that he went to the Mount Carmel Center to uncover evidence of criminal disturbance of a corpse by Roden. Koresh's followers were acquitted, and in Koresh's case, a mistrial was declared.

In 1989, Roden murdered Wayman Dale Adair with an axe blow to the skull after Adair stated his belief that he himself was the true messiah. Roden claimed the man was sent by Koresh to kill him. He was judged insane and confined to a psychiatric hospital at Big Spring, Texas. Since Roden owed thousands of dollars in unpaid taxes on the Mount Carmel Center, Koresh and his followers were able to raise the money and reclaim the property. Roden continued to harass the Koresh faction by filing legal papers while imprisoned. When Koresh and his followers reclaimed the Mount Carmel Center, they discovered that tenants who had rented from Roden had left behind a meth lab, which Koresh reported to the local police department and asked to have removed.

Name change
Vernon Howell filed a petition in California State Superior Court in Pomona on May 15, 1990, to legally change his name "for publicity and business purposes" to David Koresh. On August 28, 1990, Judge Robert Martinez granted the petition.

His first name, David, symbolized a lineage directly to the biblical King David, from whom the new messiah would descend. Koresh (כּוֹרֶשׁ, Koresh) is the Biblical name of Cyrus the Great, a Persian king who is named a messiah for freeing Jews during the Babylonian captivity. By taking the name of David Koresh, he was "professing himself to be the spiritual descendant of King David, a messianic figure carrying out a divinely commissioned errand."

Allegations of child abuse and statutory rape
Koresh was alleged to have been involved in multiple incidents of physical and sexual abuse of children. His doctrine of the House of David did lead to "marriages" with both married and single women in the Branch Davidians. This doctrine was based on a purported revelation that involved the production of twenty-four children by chosen women in the community. These twenty-four children were to serve as the twenty-four ruling elders over the millennium after the return of Christ. These women purportedly chosen through this doctrine included at least one underaged girl, Michelle Jones, who was the younger sister of Koresh's legal wife Rachel and the daughter of lifelong Branch Davidians Perry and Mary Belle Jones.

A six-month investigation of sexual abuse allegations by the Texas Child Protection Services in 1992 failed to turn up any evidence, possibly because the Branch Davidians concealed the spiritual marriage of Koresh to Michelle, assigning a surrogate husband (David Thibodeau) to the girl for the sake of appearances. Regarding the allegations of physical abuse, the evidence is less certain. In one widely reported incident, ex-members claimed that Koresh became irritated with the cries of his son Cyrus and spanked the child severely for several minutes on three consecutive visits to the child's bedroom. In a second report, a man involved in a custody battle visited the Mount Carmel Center and claimed to have seen the beating of a young boy with a stick.

Finally, the FBI's justification for forcing an end to the 51-day stand-off was predicated on the charge that Koresh was abusing children inside the Mount Carmel Center. Allegations had been made that he had fathered children with underaged girls in the Branch Davidians. In the hours that followed the deadly conflagration, Attorney General Janet Reno told reporters, "We had specific information that babies were being beaten." However, FBI Director William Sessions publicly denied the charge and told reporters that they had no such information about child abuse inside the Mount Carmel Center. A careful examination of the other child abuse charges found the evidence to be weak and ambiguous, casting doubt on the allegations.

The allegations of child abuse largely stem from detractors and ex-members. The 1993 Justice Department report cites allegations of child sexual and physical abuse. Legal scholars point out that the Bureau of Alcohol, Tobacco and Firearms (ATF) had no legal jurisdiction in the matter of child protection, and these accounts appear to have been inserted by the ATF to inflame the case against Koresh. For example, the account of former Branch Davidian Jeannine Bunds is reproduced in an ATF affidavit. She claimed that Koresh had fathered at least 15 children with various women and girls, and that she had personally delivered seven of these infants. Bunds also claims that Koresh would annul all marriages of couples who joined the group and had exclusive sexual access to the women and girls. Thibodeau, a student of Koresh and one of the few to escape the fire that destroyed the compound, stated in 2018 that while he considered Koresh a friend, he "certainly was guilty of something. He was either a polygamist or he was guilty of statutory rape. Probably both."

In his book, James Tabor states that on a videotape that was sent out of the compound during the siege, Koresh acknowledged that he had fathered more than 12 children by several "wives". On March 3, 1993, during negotiations to secure the release of the remaining children, Koresh advised hostage negotiators that: "My children are different than those others," referring to his direct lineage versus those children whom he had previously released.

Dr. Bruce Perry, the chief of psychiatry at Texas Children's Hospital who led the team that cared for the twenty-one children that survived the siege of the Davidian compound, wrote after a two-month investigation that "the children released from Ranch Apocalypse do not appear to have been victims of sexual abuse." However, while Dr. Perry noted that the Children of Waco were not physically abused, he reported that they were "likely exposed to inappropriate concepts of sexuality," and subject to "a whole variety of destructive emotional techniques ... including shame, coercion, fear, intimidation, humiliation, guilt, overt aggression and power." Perry has reiterated this view as late as 2018.

Raid and siege by federal authorities

The Waco siege began on February 28, 1993, when the ATF raided Mount Carmel Center. The ensuing gun battle resulted in the deaths of four ATF agents and six Branch Davidians. Shortly after the initial raid, the FBI Hostage Rescue Team took command of the federal operation, because the FBI has jurisdiction over incidents involving the deaths of federal agents. The negotiating team established contact with Koresh inside the compound. Communication over the next 51 days included telephone exchanges with various FBI negotiators.

Koresh himself had been seriously injured by a gunshot. As the standoff continued, he and his closest male associates negotiated delays, so that he could possibly write religious documents, which he said he needed to complete before his surrender. Koresh's conversations with the negotiators were dense and they also included biblical imagery. The FBI negotiators treated the situation as a hostage crisis.

The siege of the Mount Carmel Center ended on April 19, 1993, when U.S. Attorney General Janet Reno approved recommendations of FBI officials to proceed with a final advance in which the Branch Davidians would be removed from the Mount Carmel Center by force. In an attempt to flush Koresh out of the stronghold, the FBI resorted to pumping CS gas into the compound with the aid of an M728 Combat Engineer Vehicle, which was equipped with a battering ram. In the course of the advance, the Mount Carmel Center caught fire under circumstances that remain disputed. Barricaded inside the building, 79 Branch Davidians perished in the ensuing blaze; 21 of these victims were children under the age of 16.

Koresh, then 33, died of a gunshot wound to the head during the course of the fire. It is unknown whether he committed suicide or if he was killed. According to the FBI, Steve Schneider, Koresh's right-hand man, who "probably realized that he was dealing with a fraud," shot and killed Koresh and then committed suicide with the same gun. The medical examiner reported 20 people, including five children under the age of 14, had been shot, and a three-year-old had been stabbed in the chest.

Aftermath
Koresh is buried at Memorial Park Cemetery, Tyler, Texas, in the "Last Supper" section. Several of his albums were released, including Voice of Fire, in 1994. In 2004, Koresh's 1968 Chevrolet Camaro, which had been damaged during the raid, sold for $37,000 at auction. It is now owned by Ghost Adventures host Zak Bagans.

Timothy McVeigh and Terry Nichols cited the Waco siege as their motivation for the Oklahoma City bombing of April 19, 1995, which was timed to coincide with the second anniversary of the Waco assault.

Four documentary films have been made about the siege, including different versions of Waco: The Rules of Engagement, Waco: A New Revelation, Waco: The Big Lie, and Waco: Madman or Messiah. In 2018, BBC Radio 5 live created a radio podcast titled End of Days, which was about the death and life of Koresh, his involvement in the Waco siege, and the recruitment of people who lived in Nottingham, Manchester, and London into the Branch Davidians. The Court TV (now TruTV) television series Mugshots released an episode about Koresh.  A Mexican movie was made entitled "Tragedia en Waco" or  "Tragedia: Sucedio en Monte Carmelo Waco Texas", 1993, written by Ulf Kjell Gür. aired by EstrellaTV in April, 2021.

Koresh is portrayed by Taylor Kitsch in the 2018 miniseries Waco. He was also one of the sources of inspiration used to create the fictional cult leader Joseph Seed in the 2018 action-adventure video game Far Cry 5. In 2011, British indie rock band The Indelicates released a concept album, David Koresh Superstar, about Koresh and the Waco siege.

See also
 List of messiah claimants
 List of people claimed to be Jesus
 List of Seventh-day Adventists
 Messiah complex

References

Further reading
Lewis, J. R. (ed.), From the Ashes: Making sense of Waco (Lanham, MD: Rowman and Littlefield, 1994).
Wright, Stuart A. (ed.), Armageddon in Waco: Critical perspectives on the Branch Davidian conflict (Chicago, U. of Chicago Press, 1995).
Tabor, James, and Gallagher, Eugene, Why Waco? Cults and the battle for religious freedom in America (Berkeley, U. of California Press, 1995).
Reavis, Dick J.  The Ashes of Waco: An Investigation (New York: Simon and Schuster, 1995).  
Samples, Kenneth et al.  Prophets of the Apocalypse: David Koresh & Other American Messiahs (Grand Rapids: Baker, 1994). .
Newport, Kenneth G. C. The Branch Davidians of Waco: The History and Beliefs of an Apocalyptic Sect (Oxford, Oxford University Press, 2006).
Shaw, B. D., "State Intervention and Holy Violence: Timgad/Paleostrovsk/Waco," Journal of the American Academy of Religion, 77,4 (2009), 853–894.

External links

 

1959 births
1993 deaths
20th-century apocalypticists
Adventism
American conspiracy theorists
American former Protestants
American religious leaders
American shooting survivors
Branch Davidians
Burials in Texas
Child sexual abuse in the United States
Christian conspiracy theorists
Christian messianism
Crimes in religion
Cult leaders
Deaths by firearm in Texas
Founders of new religious movements
Garland High School alumni
People with dyslexia
People disfellowshipped by the Seventh-day Adventist Church
People from Garland, Texas
People from Houston
People from Waco, Texas
Prophets in Christianity
Religious scandals
Waco siege